Crayne may refer to:

Crayne, Kentucky, a community in Crittenden County
Dick Crayne (1913–1985), an American football fullback